Alston House (also known as McDuffie's Antiques) is a historic house located in Columbia, South Carolina.

Description and history 
The -story Greek Revival style house was built in 1872, and is significant for its historic architecture. It was added to the National Register of Historic Places on March 2, 1979.

References

Houses on the National Register of Historic Places in South Carolina
Houses in Columbia, South Carolina
Houses completed in 1872
African-American history of South Carolina
National Register of Historic Places in Columbia, South Carolina
Greek Revival houses in South Carolina